BiRite Foodservice Distributors is one of northern California's leading foodservice distributors. With more than $285 million in annual sales, BiRite is the 24th largest foodservice distributor in the nation.

On December 12, 2012, BiRite announced the acquisition of local produce company, A&B Produce.

History
The company was founded in 1966 by cousins John Barulich and Victor Barulich in San Francisco, California. At the time, it was a small warehouse of five employees who supplied canned goods to many of San Francisco's coffee shops and restaurants.

In 1981, the company moved to a new 238,000 square foot distribution facility in Brisbane, California. Currently, the company has over 300 employees and is still owned and operated by the Barulich family.

Awards
 Ranked 44th on San Francisco Business Times 100 Largest Bay Area Private Companies in 2014
 Recognized on Silicon Valley Business Journal's Bay Area's Healthiest Employers in 2013
 Ranked 24th in ID Magazine's Top 50 Distributors in 2011
 Winner of the International Foodservice Manufacturers Association Excellence in Distribution Award in 2011

References

External links

Official Website
Handheld Catering
Teppanyaki Catering

Catering and food service companies of the United States
Food and drink companies based in California